Catherine Dyer is an American actress and producer.

Life and career
Dyer born in New York City and raised in Atlanta, Georgia. She graduated from the American Academy of Dramatic Arts in New York City. In 1991, she married actor Jason MacDonald. In 1991, she moved to Los Angeles and had a one-woman-show called Sorry to Keep You Waiting. She later worked off-screen as a Development Assistant for Lifetime Television's Original Movies Department. In 1997, she returned to New York City to work as a Supervising Producer on A&E Television documentary series, Biography receiving a Primetime Emmy Award nomination in 2003.

Dyer returned to acting in 2008, playing a recurring role in the Lifetime drama series, Army Wives. She later guest-starred on Drop Dead Diva, Necessary Roughness, Devious Maids, The Originals, Greenleaf and Queen Sugar. In 2016, she had a recurring role as Agent Connie Frazier during the first season of Netflix series, Stranger Things. She later had a recurring roles on The Resident, The Morning Show and The Terminal List.

Dyer appeared in a number of movies, including Halloween II (2009), The Blind Side (2009), Sabotage (2014), Dirty Grandpa (2016), The Darkest Minds (2018), and Nappily Ever After (2018). In 2019, she played main anthogonist in the independent thriller film, The Devil to Pay opposite Danielle Deadwyler. She later was cast in the Netflix thriller, Reptile.

Filmography
Road Kill (1999)
Halloween II (2009)
The Joneses (2009)
The Blind Side (2009)
What to Expect When You're Expecting (2009)
Sabotage (2014)
Taken 3 (2014)
Accidental Love (2015)
Dirty Grandpa (2016)
Cell (2016)
The Founder (2016)
Hot Summer Nights (2017)
Megan Leavey (2017)
I, Tonya (2017)
 Simran (2017)
Forever My Girl (2018)
Steel Country (2018)
The Darkest Minds (2018)
An Actor Prepares (2018) 
Nappily Ever After (2018)
Gilda Sue Rosenstern: The Motion Picture! (2019)
The Devil to Pay (2019)
Pageant Material (2019)
8th Floor Massacre (2020)
A Unicorn for Christmas (2022)
Escape from Love (2023)
Reptile (2013)
 Freedom Hair (2023)

References

External links

20th-century American actresses
21st-century American actresses
1958 births
Actresses from New York City
American television actresses
American television producers
American film actresses
Living people